The Lakes of Killarney are a scenic attraction located in Killarney National Park near Killarney, County Kerry, in Ireland. They consist of three lakes - Lough Leane, Muckross Lake (also called Middle Lake) and Upper Lake.

Surroundings 
They are surrounded by the rugged slopes of MacGillycuddy's Reeks.

The N71 road from Killarney to Kenmare passes a viewpoint called Ladies View which offers a view of the lakes and valleys. On the occasion of Queen Victoria's visit in 1861, the point was apparently chosen by the queen's ladies-in-waiting as the finest in the land; hence the name.

Lough Leane 

It is also the largest body of fresh water in the region. The River Laune drains Lough Leane to the north-west towards Killorglin and into Dingle Bay.  

Leane is dotted with small forested islands, including Innisfallen, which holds the remains of the ruined Innisfallen Abbey. On the eastern edge of the lake, Ross Island, more properly a peninsula, was the site of some of the earliest Copper Age metalwork in prehistoric Ireland. Ross Castle, a 15th-century keep, sits on the eastern shore of the lake, north of the Ross Island peninsula.

Muckross Lake 

Also known as Middle Lake or Torc Lake, Muckross is just south of Lough Leane. The two are separated by a small peninsula, crossed by a stone arched bridge called Brickeen Bridge. A paved hiking trail of approximately  circles the lake.

Upper Lake 

The Upper Lake is the smallest of the three lakes, and the southernmost.

Folklore
According to folklore, the lakes were the haunt of Kate Kearney, who is said to have sought there O'Donaghue, an enchanted chieftain, and to have died in madness. This Kate Kearney should not be confused with the lady who provided refreshment at what is now Kate Kearney's Cottage at the Gap of Dunloe.

Gallery

See also
 List of loughs of Ireland

References

External links

 Killarney National Park
 National Library of Ireland archives for the lakes
 Ross Island

Killarney
Killarney
Ruins in the Republic of Ireland